Anthony Thomas (Tony) Rinaudo  (born 19 January 1957) is an Australian agriculturalist and missionary.

Early life and education 
Tony Rinaudo was born in the northern Victorian town of Wangaratta and raised in nearby Myrtleford.

After completing high school he studied at University of New England, Armidale (Bachelor in Rural Science) and later at Bible College of New Zealand (Bible in Missions course).

Career 
Following University and Bible College, Rinaudo served initially at a Farm School/Preparatory Bible College in Maradi, Niger and later in the Maradi Integrated Development Project with the Sudan Interior Mission, now known as SIM from 1981 to 1999.

Since 1999 he has worked for World Vision Australia in several roles, initially as a Program Officer and now as Principal Climate Action Advisor.

Rinaudo is the subject of a 2022 documentary by German filmmaker Volker Schlöndorff called 'The Forest Maker'. which was shown at the Film Without Borders film festival in Bad Saarow Germany 2022.

Achievements 
Rinaudo served as an agriculturalist and missionary with 'Serving in Mission' in Niger Republic from 1981 to 1999. There, he oversaw long-term rural development and periodic, large-scale relief programs. In this Sahel region of Niger, where tree-planting efforts were failing, he "discovered root systems remained alive underground, even in the harshest, desert-like landscapes. To encourage the 'underground forest' to grow into trees, he just needed to prune and manage the tree shoots. He inspired farmers to carry on this work over the years. Rinaudo's pioneering technique is called Farmer Managed Natural Regeneration, or FMNR." The FMNR website describes the technique as a "low-cost land restoration technique used to combat poverty and hunger amongst poor subsistence farmers by increasing food and timber production and resilience to climate extremes". He consequently earned the nickname "the Forest Maker". At the UN's global climate talks in Katowice, Poland, in 2018, it was recognised that "6M hectares of land have been regenerated under [Rinaudo's] FMNR, totalling 240M trees [and that] the reforestation of the landscape can be seen on satellite images from space".

Through these he contributed to a transformation in how Nigeriens farm, and the reforesting of over six million hectares of land, which still inspires re-greening movements globally. For his 18 years' service to humanity and the environment, the government of Niger awarded him its highest honour for an expatriate "The Order of Agriculture with Merit" (Merite Agricole du Niger).

Since joining World Vision Australia in 1999, Rinaudo initiated and/or oversaw important land regeneration projects, worldwide. Serving now as Principal Climate Action Advisor, he promotes forestry and agro-forestry initiatives globally within the World Vision partnership, and beyond, for example in East Timor and Ethiopia.

Awards 
 Commandeur du Merit, Agricole awarded by the Government of Niger for his contribution to environmental restoration and services to humanity. This is the "highest decoration which Niger bestows on expatriates, for his contribution to environmental restoration and services to humanity".
 2018 Right Livelihood Award (Alternate Nobel) "for demonstrating on a large scale how drylands can be greened at minimal cost, improving the livelihoods of millions of people".
 Member (AM) of the Order of Australia, 2019, "For significant service to conservation as a pioneer in international reforestation programs".
 FMNR being recognised by the World Future Council under the Outstanding Practice in AgroEcology 2019.

Recognition 
Rinaudo is listed as a contributor to natural resource management and conference speaker by organisations around the world:
 European Leadership Forum
 Global Earth Repair Foundation
 Global Evergreening Alliance
 Global Landscapes Foruum
 Initiatives of Change Switzerland
 Permaculture Research Institute
 Reforestation World
 The Blue Tribe Company
 United Nations Department of Economic and Social Affairs

Published works

Books 
 Autobiography The Forest Underground: Hope for a Planet in Crisis (2022) - ISCAST ,  (Awarded Australian Christian Book of the Year 2022). The book is the subject of book reviews, a radio interview and an interview in conservation news web portal Mongabay. After launching in Melbourne earlier in 2022, Rinaudo launched the book in his home region of north east Victoria on 21 August 2022.
 eBook Unsere Bäume der Hoffnung (2021) - ‎ Rüffer & Rub Sachbuchverlag  Volker Schlöndorff (Préface), Tony Rinaudo (Auteur), Dennis Garrity (Auteur), Corinna von Ludwiger (Traduction)

Articles 
 Rinaudo, T (1992), The use of Australian Acacias in the Maradi Integrated Development Project, in House, APN and Harwood, CE (Editors), Australian Dry Zone Acacias for Human Food, pp. 82–92. Camberra, Australian Tree Seed Centre, CSIRO Division of Forestry. 145 pp.
 Rinaudo, T., Burt. M and Harwood, C. (1995). Growth and seed production of Australian Acacia species at Maradi, Niger. ACIAR For. Newsl. 19:1-2. 
 Rinaudo,  T.  (2001).  Utilizing  the  underground  forest.  Farmer  Managed  Natural Regeneration of trees. pp. 325–336. In: D. Pasternak and A. Schlissel (eds.), Combating Desertification with Plants.  Kluwer Academic/Plenum Publishers, New York. 
 Rinaudo, T; Patel, T. and Thompson, L.A.J. (2002), Potential of Australian Acacias in combating hunger in semi-arid lands, Conservation Science W. Aust. 4 (3) : 161–169
 Rinaudo,  T  and  Cunningham,  P.J. (2008). Australian  acacias  as  multi-purpose  agro-forestry species for semi-arid regions of Africa. Muelleria 26(1): 79-85.  
 Cunningham, P.; Nicholson, C.; Yaou, S.; Rinaudo, Tony; Harwood, Christopher (2008) Utilization of Australian acacias for improving food security and environmental sustainability in the Sahel, West Africa, https://www.researchgate.net/publication/255457447
 Griffin, A.R.; Midgley,S.J.;  Bush, D.; Cunningham,  P.J.; Rinaudo, A.T. (2011),  Global uses of Australian acacias – recent trends and future prospects, Diversity  and Distributions, (Diversity Distrib.) 17, 837–847
 Tougiani A, Guero C, Rinaudo T (2009), Community mobilisation for improved livelihoods through tree crop management in Niger. GeoJournal 74:377-389

Biography 
  Johannes Dieterich (Editor)  (2018), Tony Rinaudo - the Forest Maker, ‎ Rüffer & Rub Sachbuchverlag.

References 

1957 births
Living people
Members of the Order of Australia
Australian agriculturalists
Australian missionaries
Australian Christians